Pertti Mattila (25 April 1909 – 9 December 1998) was a Finnish skier. He competed in the Nordic combined event at the 1936 Winter Olympics.

References

External links
 

1909 births
1998 deaths
Finnish male Nordic combined skiers
Olympic Nordic combined skiers of Finland
Nordic combined skiers at the 1936 Winter Olympics
People from Orimattila
Sportspeople from Päijät-Häme
20th-century Finnish people